Ifrane Atlas-Saghir or Ifrane, Anti-Atlas (meaning cave), is a village and commune in southern Morocco populated by some 12,000 inhabitants.  The town, its arid valley, oasis and surrounding mountains attract some tourism, from hikers and Jewish pilgrims. Ifrane Arlas-Saghir was also known by the former local Jewish community as Oufrane.

History
Ifrane Atlas-Saghir was an important trading post and market for the caravan trade moving across the Sahara to the sea-coast, until the trade faded away in the late 1800s.  The area is now populated by the Chleuh (Amazighen Berbers) group, who today generally maintain their traditional way of life.

Jewish community
Ifrane Atlas-Saghir was an ancient home to a 2,000-year-old Jewish population, the oldest in Morocco, until 1958 when they left as a group to settle in Israel. Today an important Jewish pilgrimage site is located there, being the site of a mass suicide of the 1700s, undertaken in the face of a brutal persecution by a local sorcerer. The remains of Jewish cemeteries are also known today... "in the gorges of the Oufrane, there are ancient cemeteries with headstones that have inscriptions in Hebrew."  The descendants of Maklouf have maintained an oral history of their family's fate following the massacre, which their great-great-great-great grandmother managed to escape. Due to the importance of Ifrane's Jewish heritage, a synagogue has been restored in the abandoned mellah there, by the Foundation for Jewish-Moroccan Cultural Heritage. The district's long-standing Jewish culture has left another lasting legacy, in the form of the continuing observance of some aspects of Jewish folklore among the local Berbers.

Notable people from Ifrane Atlas-Saghir
Mohammed al-Mokhtar Soussi
Abdellah Baha
Mustapha Hadji
Youssouf Hadji
Abdellah Askarne

See also
Bouizakarne
Guelmim
Noun River

References 

Rural communes of Guelmim-Oued Noun
Populated places in Guelmim Province
Jews and Judaism in Morocco
Jewish pilgrimage sites